Edward O'Brien (18 September 1974 – 18 February 1996) was a Provisional Irish Republican Army (IRA) volunteer.

He died in the Aldwych bus bombing when the bomb he was carrying exploded prematurely.

Background
O'Brien grew up in Gorey, County Wexford, with his parents and two siblings. As a child he attended the local national and secondary schools. A keen sportsman, he was a member of St Enda's GAA Club where he played football and hurling and also played for Gorey Rangers soccer club. He also was regarded as a talented boxer, and worked in a bakery.

Active service
O'Brien joined the IRA in 1992. He went to England to engage in paramilitary activity in an active service unit. Documents later recovered from O'Brien's residence indicated he was working for the IRA in Britain as early as August 1994, collecting information on targets, and assembling bomb-making equipment during a seventeen-month ceasefire. O'Brien may have been responsible for planting a bomb in a London telephone box on 15 February 1996 that was later deactivated by the police.

Death

O'Brien was killed on 18 February 1996, when an improvised explosive device he was carrying detonated prematurely on a number 171 bus in Aldwych, in the West End of central London. The 2 kg (4 lb) semtex bomb detonated as he sat near the door of the bus. A pathologist found O'Brien was killed "virtually instantaneously" from "massive injuries", and it also caused injuries to numerous passengers, passers-by and the driver.

O’Brien was the first IRA volunteer to be killed following the Docklands bombing nine days earlier that signalled the end of the "cessation of military operations" ordered by the IRA leadership in 1994. A subsequent police search of his London address discovered 15 kg (30 lb) of semtex, 20 timers, four detonators, and ammunition for a 9 mm Walther revolver, along with an incendiary device. The Walther pistol was discovered on him after his death.

O'Brien is buried in St Michael's Cemetery in his home town of Gorey, County Wexford, Ireland.

References

1974 births
1996 deaths
Deaths by improvised explosive device in England
Irish expatriates in England
People from Gorey
Provisional Irish Republican Army members